The 1884 Princeton Tigers football team represented the College of New Jersey, then more commonly known as Princeton College, in the 1884 college football season. The Tigers finished with a 9–0–1 record and were retroactively named national champions by the Billingsley Report and co-champions by Parke H. Davis. This season marked Princeton's 12th football national championship. Clinton N. Bird was the team captain.

Schedule

References

Princeton
Princeton Tigers football seasons
College football national champions
College football undefeated seasons
Princeton Tigers football